Dolioletta is a genus of tunicates in the family Doliolidae.

Characteristics
Members of the genus Dolioletta are transparent, gelatinous barrel-shaped animals, usually less than one centimetre long. They move in jerks by contracting the circular bands of muscle in their body wall sharply.

Biology
They have the complex life cycle typical of the doliolids, with alternating sexual and asexual phases. They use a net of mucus strands to efficiently trap phytoplankton floating past. They both grow fast and multiply rapidly and a single animal is capable of forming thousands of new individuals in a few days. They sometimes form dense swarms with up to 500 individuals per square metre.

Species
The World Register of Marine Species lists the following species:
Dolioletta chuni (Neumann, 1906)
Dolioletta gegenbauri  (Uljanin, 1884)
Dolioletta mirabilis  Korotneff, 1891
Dolioletta tritonis  Herdman, 1888
Dolioletta valdiviae  (Neumann, 1906)

References

Thaliacea
Tunicate genera